Bhalche is a village development committee in Nuwakot District in the Bagmati Zone of central Nepal. At the time of the 1991 Nepal census it had a population of 2947 living in 624 individual households.

Currently bhalche is one of the ward of Kispang Rural Municipality of Nuwakot District.

References

External links
UN map of the municipalities of Nuwakot District

Populated places in Nuwakot District